A gold compact disc is one in which gold is used in place of the super pure aluminium
commonly used as the reflective coating on ordinary CDs or silver on ordinary CD-Rs.

Gold CDs can be played in any CD player. Blank gold CD-Rs are also available. They can be recorded in any CD recorder and played in any CD player.

The advantage of the gold reflection layer is its increased resistance to corrosion, in contrast to the ordinary aluminium layer found on normal compact discs. Due to concerns over the incidence of CD rot on early CDs (mainly manufactured by PDO UK), gold CDs were thus seen as a potential solution. 

In 2014, Audio Fidelity, an American publisher of audiophile CDs, announced that it was abandoning the gold format and moving to the  hybrid Super Audio CD (SACD) format for future releases.

Since 2016, the Australian division of Sony Music have been reissuing back catalogue CDs as budget-priced (under $10) issues with gold CDs under the "Gold Series" branding.

Examples 
 Al Stewart - Last Days of the Century
 Blondie - Parallel Lines
 Blood, Sweat & Tears - Child Is Father to the Man
 Bryan Adams - Reckless
 Counting Crows - August and Everything After
 David Bowie
 The Man Who Sold the World
 The Rise and Fall of Ziggy Stardust and the Spiders from Mars
 Young Americans
 Station to Station
 Low
 "Heroes"
 Let's Dance
 Changesbowie
 Jimmy Buffett
 Changes in Latitudes, Changes in Attitudes
 Son of a Son of a Sailor
 Songs You Know by Heart
 Bob Dylan
 Highway 61 Revisited
 Blonde on Blonde
 The Doors - Strange Days
 The Eagles - Hell Freezes Over
 Joe Jackson
 Night and Day
 Will Power
 Michael Jackson
 Off the Wall
 Thriller
 Bad
 HIStory: Past, Present and Future, Book I
 Michael Jackson's Ghosts - Limited Edition Minimax CD
 Elton John - Elton John's Greatest Hits
 Enya - The Memory of Trees (Japanese limited edition)
 Jefferson Airplane - Surrealistic Pillow
 Jethro Tull - Aqualung
 Jean-Michel Jarre
Oxygène
 Équinoxe
 John Coltrane - Blue Train
 John Coltrane and Paul Quinichette - Cattin' with Coltrane and Quinichette
 John Lennon - Imagine
 Metallica - Master of Puppets
 Nirvana
 Nevermind
 In Utero
 Pat Benatar - In the Heat of the Night
 Paul & Linda McCartney - Ram
 Pink Floyd
 Atom Heart Mother
 Meddle
 The Dark Side of the Moon
 Wish You Were Here
 The Wall
 Sonny Rollins - Sonny Rollins and the Contemporary Leaders
 The Police
 Ghost in the Machine
 Synchronicity
 R.E.M.
 Murmur
 Reckoning
 Red Hot Chili Peppers - Mother's Milk
 Sagarika -
 Maa
 Mere Liye
 The Who
 Who's Next
 Quadrophenia
 Yuridia - Entre Mariposas
 Zubeen Garg - Sparsh

See also 
 Compact disc
 Enhanced CD
 Remastering
 CD rot
 Gold album
 Audiophile
 Mobile Fidelity Sound Lab (MFSL)
 Super Audio CD
 Extended Resolution Compact Disc

References

External links

Compact disc
Gold